Oliver Henry was a Coast Guardsman who served from 1940 to 1966 in the United States Coast Guard. When Henry started serving in the Coast Guard, the United States Armed Forces were still racially segregated so he served as a mess steward, an all black rating. He was the first black to transfer from the mess steward rating. He was transferred to the motor machinist mate rating – related to his pre-service work as an auto mechanic.

Personal life

Henry was born in 1921, in Winterville, North Carolina.  After his high school graduation he worked as an auto mechanic, until he enlisted in the Coast Guard, in 1940.

Henry married in the 1950s, and his daughter, Jo-Ann, married the first black graduate of the U.S. Coast Guard Academy, Merle J. Smith.

Coast Guard career

William Thiesen, of the Coast Guard Historian's Office, noted that during segregation, when all black sailors served as mess stewards, mess stewards could not be promoted to petty officer rank.

In 1942 Northlands executive officer, Lieutenant Commander Carlton Skinner, recommended transferring Henry to the engineering division. He submitted test results showing Henry had excellent qualifications, but bureaucrats in the Coast Guard's personnel administration turned down the request because Henry was "colored". Skinner appealed, and Henry was transferred.

Henry rose quickly through the ranks on Northland, being promoted to chief petty officer in late 1943.

Henry would serve on seven more cutters, after World War II, including .

In 1950 Henry was promoted to warrant officer, and would rise through the warrant officer ranks. Late in his career he served on the Coast Guard's Member Auditing Board and Member Training Board.

Maritime Administration career

Following his career in the Coast Guard Henry joined the U.S. Maritime Administration.  When he retired in 1986 he was deputy director of the administration's Southern California office.

Legacy

In 2010, Master Chief Petty Officer of the Coast Guard Charles "Skip" W. Bowen, proposed that all the cutters in the  should be named after enlisted Coast Guardsmen, or one of its precursor services, who were recognized for their heroism, or who otherwise represented a model of service that should be emulated. In 2018 the Coast Guard announced Henry would be the namesake of the 40th Sentinel class cutter, .

When the Oliver Henry is stationed at its home port of Santa Rita, Guam, it will be at a maintenance facility named after his mentor, Carlton Skinner.

Henry's descendants attended the commissioning of USCGC Oliver Henry.

References

1921 births
1987 deaths
United States Coast Guard officers
United States Department of Transportation officials
United States Coast Guard personnel of World War II